Crooked River Gorge is a  gorge located around Warm Springs and Smith Rock State Park, Central Oregon, United States. The gorge is surrounded by  cliffs filled with a variety of wildlife.
The upper part of the Crooked River Gorge, which are also popular among climbers, are made of columnar basalt cliffs eroded by the Crooked River since the Newberry volcanic eruption 1.2 million years ago.

References

External links 
 Oregon Field Guide: Crooked River Gorge Cleanup, 1993

Landforms of Jefferson County, Oregon
Canyons and gorges of Oregon